Lorenzo Mediano (born 1959, Zaragoza)  is a Spanish physician, writer and wilderness survival instructor. He is the author of several novels such as  Los olvidados de Filipinas, La escarcha sobre los hombros, El Secreto de la Diosa and Tras la huella del hombre rojo.

Works
 Vivir en el campo (1988), RBA LIBROS, S.A.
 La escarcha sobre los hombros (1998), Onagro Ediciones.
 Cuentos de amor imposible (2002), Onagro Ediciones.
 Los olvidados de Filipinas (2005), Onagro Ediciones.
 El secreto de la diosa (2003), Grijalbo.
 El secreto de la diosa (2003), Círculo de Lectores, S.A.
 El secreto de la diosa (2004), Nuevas Ediciones de Bolsillo.
 El secreto de la diosa (2005), RBA Coleccionables, S.A.
 Tras la huella del hombre rojo (2005), Grijalbo.
 Donde duermen las aguas (2006), Onagro Ediciones.
 El espíritu del trigo (2007), Grijalbo.
 El siglo de las mujeres (2009), Onagro Ediciones.
 El escriba del barro (2010),Grijalbo.
 El desembarco de Alah (2013), Tropo Editores

References

1959 births
Living people
People from Zaragoza
20th-century Spanish writers
20th-century Spanish male writers
Spanish medical writers
21st-century Spanish writers
21st-century Spanish physicians
20th-century Spanish physicians